Capital punishment is a legal penalty in the U.S. state of Montana. 

Of the states that currently retain the death penalty, Montana is the only one that has not handed down a death sentence in the 21st century. The last time the state sentenced a defendant to death was in 1996. The state has not carried out an execution in over fifteen years, with its last execution carried out in 2006, when David Thomas Dawson was executed for three murders. Montana has currently two condemned inmates, including Canadian Ronald Allen Smith for the kidnapping and murder of two Aboriginal men.

Legal process
Montana is the only state where the sentence is decided by the trial judge alone rather than by a jury or by a three-judge panel. But the jury is the trier of facts for both the murder and the aggravating factor making the defendant eligible for the death penalty.

The governor has the power of clemency with respect to death sentences.

Lethal injection is the only method of execution provided by statutes. Hanging was authorized until 1994.

Capital crimes
Under Montana law, deliberate homicide is punishable by death when committed:
By an offender while in official detention;
By an offender who had been previously convicted of another deliberate homicide;
By means of torture;
By lying in wait or ambush;
As a part of a scheme or operation that, if completed, would result in the death of more than one person; 
During the course of committing sexual assault, sexual intercourse without consent, deviate sexual conduct, or incest, and the victim was less than 18 years of age.
Against a peace officer killed while performing the officer's duty.
Montana statute books still provide the death penalty for various non-homicidal crimes against the person, including aggravated kidnapping, aggravated sexual intercourse without consent by a person with a prior record for aggravated sexual intercourse without consent which has resulted in serious bodily injury during the course of committing each offence, and attempted murder, aggravated assault, or aggravated kidnapping committed while in official detention and such person was previously convicted of murder or was found to be a persistent felony offender, and one of the convictions was for an offense against the person  but the death penalty for these crimes is no longer constitutional since the 2008 U.S. Supreme Court case Kennedy v. Louisiana.

See also
List of people executed in Montana
List of death row inmates in Montana
Crime in Montana
Law of Montana

References

 
Montana
Montana law